Headin' East is a 1937 American Western film directed by Ewing Scott.

Plot 
Cowboy Buck Benson (Buck Jones) trades his trusty six-shooter for bare knuckles and batters his way from the wide-open plains to crack down on mob-related crime in Manhattan.

Cast 
 Buck Jones as Buck Benson
 Ruth Coleman as Helen Calhoun
 Shemp Howard as Windy Wylie
 Donald Douglas as Eric Ward
 Elaine Arden as Penny
 Frank Faylen as Joe
 Leo Gorcey as Boy Boxer in Gym (Uncredited)

Production
The working title of the film was West of Broadway.

References

External links
 

1937 films
Columbia Pictures films
American Western (genre) films
1937 Western (genre) films
American black-and-white films
Films directed by Ewing Scott
1930s American films